Frank Friday Fletcher (November 23, 1855 – November 28, 1928) was a United States Navy admiral who served in the late 19th and early 20th centuries. He was awarded the U.S. military's highest decoration, the Medal of Honor, for his actions as commander of navy forces at the Battle of Veracruz, Mexico. The , the most produced class of United States Navy destroyers, was named after him.  He was also the uncle of Frank Jack Fletcher, another U.S. Navy Admiral who also received the Medal of Honor for actions at Veracruz, and who commanded U.S. naval forces at the battles of Coral Sea and Midway during the Second World War.

Biography
Fletcher was born on November 23, 1855, in Oskaloosa, Iowa. He was the uncle of World War II Admiral Frank Jack Fletcher. After ordnance training in late 1887, he had five years' duty at the Bureau of Ordnance, during which time he was promoted to lieutenant and made notable contributions to gun mechanism design and shipboard navigation.

From 1892 to 1895, Fletcher commanded the navy's first torpedo boat, based at the Torpedo Station in Newport, Rhode Island, and developed the navy's first torpedo warfare doctrine. He then served in the battleship  before returning to the Newport Torpedo Station in October 1896. After a brief tour as Assistant Chief of the Bureau of Ordnance in the spring of 1898, Lieutenant Fletcher became commanding officer of the converted yacht . From October 1898 to July 1901 he commanded the surveying ship  and, in March 1899, was promoted to lieutenant commander.

In the fall of 1901, Fletcher returned to ordnance duty and was closely involved with torpedo warfare. A year later he became Chief of Staff of the Asiatic Fleet and later in 1905 assumed command of the cruiser . Fletcher attended the Naval War College courses in both 1907 and 1908 and in 1908 was assigned to the navy's General Board during the next year. That same year, he became a member of the District of Columbia Society of the Sons of the American Revolution.

He was promoted to captain in May 1908 and from November of that year to March 1910 he commanded the battleship . In the spring of 1910, Fletcher became the Secretary of the Navy's Aide for Material. While in that post, he reached the rank of rear admiral. From 1912 to 1914, he commanded battleship divisions of the Atlantic Fleet. In April 1914, Fletcher led U.S. Navy forces during the landings at Vera Cruz, Mexico, receiving the Medal of Honor for his "distinguished conduct in battle".

In September 1914, Fletcher began two years as the Atlantic Fleet's Commander in Chief, and was elevated to the rank of admiral in March 1915, the senior of the first three officers to hold the new four-star positions. He was a member of the General Board, the Joint Army and Navy Board and the War Industries Board in 1916–1919, and was awarded the Navy Distinguished Service Medal for "meritorious service" during World War I.  He was also awarded the Army Distinguished Service Medal for his work as the navy representative on the War Industries Board.

Admiral Fletcher retired on November 23, 1919, with the rank of rear admiral (as was customary at that time), and subsequently served as an official advisor on contemporary defense issues. Fletcher died on November 28, 1928, in New York City. He was buried in Arlington National Cemetery.

Legacy
The  was named for Fletcher and was the most numerous class of destroyers produced during World War II, with 175 completed, and one of the most successful designs of the war. The lead ship in the class, was in commission from 1942 to 1969.

Medal of Honor citation
Rank and organization: Rear Admiral, U.S. Navy. Born: November 23, 1855, Oskaloosa, Iowa. Accredited to: Iowa. G.O. No.: 177, December 4, 1915.

Citation:

For distinguished conduct in battle, engagements of Vera Cruz, 21 and 22 April 1914. Under fire, Rear Adm. Fletcher was eminent and conspicuous in the performance of his duties; was senior officer present at Vera Cruz, and the landing and the operations of the landing force were carried out under his orders and directions. In connection with these operations, he was at times on shore and under fire.

Awards
Medal of Honor
Distinguished Service Medal (U.S. Navy)
Distinguished Service Medal (U.S. Army)
Spanish Campaign Medal
Mexican Service Medal
World War I Victory Medal

Dates of rank
Midshipman: June 18, 1870
Passed Midshipman: June 21, 1875

See also

 List of Medal of Honor recipients (Veracruz)

References

External links
 

1855 births
1928 deaths
Burials at Arlington National Cemetery
Naval War College alumni
People from Oskaloosa, Iowa
Recipients of the Navy Distinguished Service Medal
Sons of the American Revolution
United States Naval Academy alumni
United States Navy admirals
United States Navy Medal of Honor recipients
Battle of Veracruz (1914) recipients of the Medal of Honor
United States Navy personnel of the Spanish–American War
United States Navy personnel of World War I
Admirals of World War I
Military personnel from Iowa